This list of town defences in Scotland identifies both the defensive walls and stone walls that were built around towns and cities in Scotland. Scottish burghs were rarely enclosed by walls unlike many English and Welsh cities and towns such as York, Caernarfon or Chester. Gates, known in Scotland as ports, were often established to control who or what went into and out of the city or town, They were used to collect tolls and duties, rather than to defend the town from invaders, such as Aberdeen who never had a town wall.

List

See also
Derry city walls
List of town walls in England and Wales
List of cities with defensive walls

References

Sources 
Cullen, W. Douglas (1988).  The Walls of Edinburgh. Cockburn Association. 

 Scotland
Lists of buildings and structures in Scotland
Fortified settlements
Scottish military-related lists